= Electro Scan Inc. =

- Type: Private
- Industry: Water, Wastewater
- Founded: 2011; 15 years ago in Sacramento, California, United States
- Headquarters: Sacramento
- Key people: Chuck Hansen, CEO, Chairman
- Website: www.electroscan.com

Electro Scan Inc. is a designer and manufacturer of water and sewer machine-intelligent pipeline inspection devices and provider of Software-as-a-Service (SaaS) based cloud reporting. The company utilizes electric currents to detect leaks in non-conductive sewer pipes. The company is based in Sacramento, California, with additional offices in London, England and Toronto, Canada.

== History ==
Electro Scan was founded in October 2011 by Chuck Hansen in Sacramento, California. In 2012, the Water Environment Research Foundation approved a testing project in Wauwatosa, Wisconsin, in which the company used its technology to check non-conductive sewer pipes that had previously been inspected for leaks using other methods. Its technology was utilized by the Metropolitan Sewer District of Greater Cincinnati and the Twin City Water & Sewer District, Ohio, to measure leaks in their systems in 2014. In July 2015, the City of San Francisco's Public Utilities Commission ordered an Electro Scan van and equipment to inspect its pipes. That same year, the company's technology was used by the city of Surrey, British Columbia, to address defects in their sewer system that CCTV inspections weren't able to find.

In 2015, Electro Scan Inc. executed a strategic marketing agreement with UK-based WRC plc (Swindon, England), developers of international standards for Closed-Circuit Television (CCTV) coding standards, to supply Electro Scan services to British water companies for Pre- and Post-Rehabilitation Pipeline Condition Assessment of pipelines.

In 2019, Electro Scan Inc. was first named to the GovTech 100 list of top government technologies, and again in 2020.

== Technology ==
The company's electro scanning inspection technology utilizes a low-voltage high-frequency electric current produced by a probe placed inside a non-conductive sewer line to check the 360-degree wall of the pipe for leaks. The probe is able to determine the size of leaks by the amount of electrical current detected outside of the pipes. The data collected is relayed to a nearby truck and then uploaded to Amazon web servers where it is interpreted before being available for review on a company website.
